Nannie Louise Wright (June 30, 1879  March 16, 1958) was an American composer, pianist, and teacher born in Fayette, Missouri. She graduated from Howard-Payne Junior College in Fayette and the Columbia School of Music in Chicago, Illinois. Wright studied piano with Mary Wood Chase in Chicago and with Josef Lhévinne in Berlin. She returned to Fayette to become the Director of Music at Howard- Payne College in 1909. Later, she served as President of the Missouri State Music Teachers' Association and as Dean of Music at Central Methodist University's Swinney Conservatory of Music in Fayette.
 
Her compositions include:

Orchestra 
Piano Concerto, opus 42 (also arranged for two pianos)

Piano 
Acrobatic Stunts (1949)
Air de Ballet
American Indian Sketches, opus 63 (1921)
At Evening, opus 38
Autumn, Winter, Spring
Banjo, opus 74 no. 4
Banjo Picker
Bee and the Clover
Bell
Bells Across the Valley (1953)
Birds, opus 36 no. 3
Circus Parade, opus 30 no. 1
Concert Study in C Major (1924)
Dance of the Brownies, opus 98, no. 2
Glory to God (1953)
Grandmother's Minuet, opus 98 no. 1
Happy and Gay (1949)
Hop, Skip and Play (1953)
Humoresque
Ice Skating (1949)
In Springtime, opus 36  Jaunty Ride (1949)
Juggler
March, opus 22
March of the Boy Scouts, opus 74 no. 1
Melody in e minor (1949)
Miniature Etudes, opus 71
Night Song
Orchard Swing (1942)
Pieces, opus 24
Plantation Dance, opus 98 no. 3
Prelude, opus 25 no. 1
Roller Coaster (1953)
Rondo, opus 4 no. 1
Scarf Dance
Scherzo (1953)
Serenade, opus 14
Seven Melodious Pieces
Six Little Pieces, opus 24
Thoughts at Twilight (1949)
Twelve Etudes
Twelve Preludes (1915)
Valse Poetique (1953)
Veil Dance
Venetian Serenade
Waltz

References 

American women composers
American composers
1879 births
1958 deaths